In mathematics, the tunnel number of a knot, as first defined by Bradd Clark, is a knot invariant, given by the minimal number of arcs (called tunnels) that must be added to the knot so that the complement becomes a handlebody.  The tunnel number can equally be defined for links.  The boundary of a regular neighbourhood of the union of the link and its tunnels forms a Heegaard splitting of the link exterior.

Examples 

 The unknot is the only knot with tunnel number 0.
 The trefoil knot has tunnel number 1. In general, any nontrivial torus knot has tunnel number 1.

Every link L has a tunnel number. This can be seen, for example, by adding a 'vertical' tunnel at every crossing in a diagram of L. It follows from this construction that the tunnel number of a knot is always less than or equal to its crossing number.

References 

.
.
.
.

Knot invariants